The 1980 Monaco Grand Prix was a Formula One motor race held at Monaco on 18 May 1980. It was the sixth round of the 1980 Formula One season. The race was the 38th Monaco Grand Prix. The race was held over 76 laps of the 3.34-kilometre circuit for a total race distance of 254 kilometres.

It was won by Carlos Reutemann driving a Williams FW07B. The win was the Argentine Reutemann's tenth Formula One victory and his first since the 1978 United States Grand Prix. He also became the fifth winner in six races of the 1980 season. Reutemann won by 1 minute and 13 seconds over French driver Jacques Laffite driving Ligier JS11/15. Third was Brazilian driver Nelson Piquet driving a Brabham BT49. Piquet's third place moved him past René Arnoux and Alan Jones into the lead of the world championship for the first time.

The race however is remembered for a memorable and spectacular crash at the start of the race when Derek Daly collided with Bruno Giacomelli's Alfa Romeo 179, which sent Daly's Tyrrell 010 flying over Giacomelli and landing between teammate Jean-Pierre Jarier and Alain Prost's McLaren M29. All four drivers were out on the spot, but none suffered any serious injury. Jan Lammers also collected damage in his ATS D4 but was able to continue. The accident was particularly disappointing for McLaren after John Watson failed to qualify for Monaco's shortened 20 car grid.

Fourth was West German driver Jochen Mass driving an Arrows A3 one lap down on Reutemann ahead of Canadian Gilles Villeneuve in a Ferrari 312T5. A further lap down in sixth was dual-World Champion Emerson Fittipaldi in a Fittipaldi F7. For Mass and Fittipaldi it would be last world championship points they would collect.

Reutemann's win put Williams in the lead of the constructor's points race by five points over Ligier.

Classification

Qualifying

Race

Championship standings after the race

Drivers' Championship standings

Constructors' Championship standings

Note: Only the top five positions are included for both sets of standings.

References

Monaco Grand Prix
Monaco Grand Prix
Grand Prix